Subhadra Parinayam was an Indian Telugu language soap opera directed by K V Reddy that aired on Gemini TV from 14 October 2019 to 28 February 2020. The show starred Chaitra Reddy, Baladitya, Srirag and Shaurya Shashank.

Cast
 Chaitra Reddy as Subhadra
Baladitya as Krishna, Subhadra's brother
Shaurya Shashank as Dattu
Srirag as Pardhu, Subhadra's husband
Suresh as Dattu and Rukmini's father
Sripriya as Sumithra, Pardhu's mother

References

External links
 Official website 

Indian television soap operas
Telugu-language television shows
2019 Indian television series debuts
Gemini TV original programming